Dipterocarpus rigidus grows as a large tree up to  tall, with a trunk diameter of up to . Bark is rust-brown. Habitat is mixed dipterocarp forest on low hills near coasts. D. rigidus is found in Sumatra, Peninsular Malaysia and Borneo.

References

rigidus
Plants described in 1920
Critically endangered plants
Trees of Sumatra
Trees of Peninsular Malaysia
Trees of Borneo